High Strung is a 1991 American independent comedy film directed by Roger Nygard. It stars Steve Oedekerk (who also wrote the script with Robert Kuhn) as Thane Furrows, an uptight children's author who rarely leaves his house, eats only cereal, and is irritated by everything around him. It also stars Thomas F. Wilson, Fred Willard, Denise Crosby, Jani Lane, and Jim Carrey, and also contains a short cameo appearance by a young Kirsten Dunst.

Despite the lack of a release on DVD, High Strung has developed and maintained a strong cult fan base.

Plot
The film centers around Thane Furrows, who spends the day messing around his apartment and complaining about a number of random subjects like (among other things) flies, popsicles, junk mail, his boss' wife, his upstairs neighbor, smoking, salesmen, and philosophizes on a number of things such as the morality of eating humans and the sensibility of keeping pets.

Furrows has a number of strange philosophies: he wishes his children's books to be instructive for the good of society, such as How to Start the Family Car (in case "someone chokes on a chicken bone" and "there are no adults around"), and Bye Bye Grandma which he wants to help accustom children to death. He refuses to keep pets because he feels they would "turn on you" in a food shortage, choosing instead to keep a cardboard cutout of a dog named Pete.

A number of minor annoyances also perturb him throughout the day: a fly lands on his cereal at breakfast, which he inadvertently eats; an insurance salesman named Ray comes to the door, to which Furrows responds by feigning interest and, shortly after promising to take out a number of policies, slams the door in Ray's face with the words "I'd rather be dead"; an automated survey about carpet cleaning calls him repeatedly; his boss' wife comes by to pick up a book he was writing, and he (eventually) tells her off. After the fly incident, Furrows suffers from a number of scares. When closing his eyes, he repeatedly sees a menacing face. He receives numerous messages from phone and mail about "eight o'clock".

Furrows' only friend appears to be a man named Al, who comes by in the afternoon for a visit. They eat cereal and Al tries to dissuade Thane of his cynicism. While Thane attacks the optimism of people like Al, he seems comforted by Al's sympathy over the visit of Melanie, the boss' wife. Later that night, Furrows loses an arm wrestling match to the noisy neighbour upstairs, thereby giving him the right to play metal as loud as he wants whenever he wants. After a day of "messing around", Furrows receives a knock at the door at the dreaded "eight o'clock" and is greeted by a limo driver. When he steps into the limo, the driver (Jim Carrey) turns around and reveals himself to be Death.

Death tells Furrows that he has met his quota of saying "I wish I were dead" and must die, and Furrows complains about the stupidity of the rule until Death, unable to scare Furrows into line, puts him back into his body. Furrows awakes with frightened Al standing over him, trying to wake him. The story ends with the two going out to a restaurant, though Furrows' insistence that they serve him cereal, showing he's willing to try some new things but not all.

After the credits, a short epilogue involves Death stopping the limo in a dark space and looking at the heavens. He claims that he just couldn't stand Thane and had to return him to life. He adds that he isn't ever coming back for Thane, implying that Thane may have just accidentally become immortal.

Production
High Strung was funded by former orchestra conductor Vladimir Horunzhy and rock guitarist Sergei Zholobetsky, both whom had fled to the United States from Russia in 1979 after they refused to join the Communist Party. Horunzhy persuaded Zholobetsky to invest his entire life savings to produce the film. High Strung was made on a budget of $400,000.

Jim Carrey agreed to a small role in the film due to his friendship with Steve Oedekerk. His cameo is uncredited per the terms of contract, which reportedly forbids using Carrey's name in the film’s title, closing credits or the credit block on advertising posters. Carrey's management team asked the film producers to not use his name or likeness in association with the promotion of the film. Regardless, Carrey was featured prominently in the film's marketing.

Release
High Strung was screened at several film festivals including the San Jose Film Festival, the Palm Springs Film Festival, the 16th Cleveland International Film Festival, the 22nd USA Festival, Houston International Film Festival, the Rivertown Film Festival/Minneapolis, New Hampshire Film Festival, the Florida Film Festival, and the Philadelphia Film Festival, and the Berkshire Film Festival. Despite positive reviews and winning awards, the producers failed to secure theatrical or home-video distribution. According to Roger Nygard, "I learned the film industry is like selling shoes-they all want brand names, and we didn’t have a brand name. Steve Oedekerk is quite well known as a stand-up comic, but that didn't matter to exhibitors. They wanted film names."

The success of Ace Ventura: Pet Detective (1994) launched Carrey's film career and renewed interest in High Strung among several independent distributors. The film producers sold the distribution rights to Rocket Pictures which released the film on VHS in 1994.

Cast
 Steve Oedekerk as Thane Furrows, a cynical children's book author and the main protagonist of the film.
 Thomas F. Wilson as Al Dalby, Thane's idealistic friend who is constantly annoyed by Thane's cynicism.
 Denise Crosby as Melanie, the demanding and mean-spirited wife of Thane's employer Marvin.
 Fred Willard as Ray, a jolly insurance salesman who visits Thane at the beginning of the film.
 Jani Lane as Vol, Thane's obnoxious neighbor who listens to rock-and-roll relentlessly.
 Ed Williams as Marvin, Thane's good-natured boss and Melanie's husband.
 Ivy Austin as Contestant
 Kirsten Dunst as Young Girl
 Toni Sawyer as Mrs. Furrows, Thane's mother
 Mark Eugene Roberts as Limo Driver
 Jim Carrey as Death, the somewhat comedic Grim Reaper who plans to obtain Thane's soul and the main antagonist.

References

External links
 
 

American independent films
1991 films
1991 comedy films
American comedy films
1991 directorial debut films
Films with screenplays by Steve Oedekerk
1990s English-language films
Films directed by Roger Nygard
1990s American films